The Tren Suburbano is an electric suburban rail system in Mexico City. It is operated by Ferrocarriles Suburbanos with concessioned trains from Construcciones y Auxiliar de Ferrocarriles (CAF). It was designed to complement the extensive Mexico City metro system, Latin America's largest and busiest urban rail network.

A second line is under construction to connect with the Felipe Ángeles International Airport (AIFA) in Zumpango.

History and description

The section, which began commercial service on June 2, 2008 (after three weeks of fare-free trial operation), cost US$706 million to build, with the Mexican Federal Government contributing 55% of this investment. The inaugural demonstration trip of the service from Buenavista to Lechería Station and back again was made by then-President of Mexico, Felipe Calderón Hinojosa, and then-Governor of the State of Mexico (and eventual president of the country), Enrique Peña Nieto, with Calderón acting as the train's engineer.

Line 1 was built on an existing at-grade railroad right of way. However, inside Mexico City itself on the approach to Buenavista Station, a considerable amount of grade separation, including below-grade excavation and new bridges, was necessary due to high density and traffic congestion. The construction elicited complaints by Mexico City residents who objected to having their neighborhoods split by the rail line, but the public supported the project overall.

In addition to the track, the construction of Tren Suburbano also benefited from like-new electrification infrastructure already in place along most of the route, part of National Railways of Mexico (NdeM)'s Mexico City-Querétaro 25 kV 60 Hz mainline electrification completed in the 1990s but de-energized a few years later after NdeM was privatized.

On August 24, 2005, Construcciones y Auxiliar de Ferrocarriles, S.A. (CAF) obtained a 30-year concession to supply rolling stock, build and operate the Tren Suburbano. The trains used on this service are electric trains built by CAF and are similar to the series 2000 trains of the Companhia Paulista de Trens Metropolitanos of São Paulo, Brazil.

Service

Ridership
Line 1 was projected to carry 100 million passengers annually. From the period of June 1, 2008 through July 7, 2008, the service carried one million passengers, or an average of approximately 30,000 passengers per day, which is a rate far below the annual projections. As of January 31, 2010 according to the head of Comercialización y Administración de Riesgos del Ferrocarril Suburbano stated that Line 1 of the Suburban Railway of the Mexico City Metropolitan Area served an average of 88,000 passengers per day. As of the end of 2012, ridership reached 132,000 per day, short of the 192,000 per day the private operator needed to stay solvent due to the high initial upfront cost and debt schedule. In 2012, the system ran an operational profit, but the profit was not high enough to cover accumulated debt repayment yet.  Ridership had increased to 184,000 per day as of 2015. As of 2018, the Tren Suburbano had an average of 200,000 passengers per day. Due to the COVID-19 pandemic in Mexico, ridership decreased 73% as of May 2020.

Trains are scheduled every 6 minutes during peak hours.

Fare structure
As of 2021, the fares are 9.50 pesos (approximately US$0.45) for a trip of three or fewer stations and 21.50 pesos (approximately US$1) for longer trips of four or more stations. Fares are paid using a rechargeable card that costs 15.00 pesos.

Stations

{| class="wikitable" rules="all"
|-
!rowspan="2" | No.
!rowspan="2" | Station
!rowspan="2" | Date opened
!rowspan="2" | Level
!colspan="2" | Distance (km)
!rowspan="2" | Connection
!rowspan="2" colspan="2" | Location
|-
!style="font-size: 65%;"|Betweenstations
!style="font-size: 65%;"|Total
|-
|style="background: #FF1100; color: white;"|01
|Buenavista
| rowspan="5" |2 June 2008
|Grade level, overground access
|style="text-align:right;"|-
|style="text-align:right;"|0.0
|
 Buenavista
 (at distance)
  Line B: Buenavista station
  Line 1: Buenavista station
  Line 3: Buenavista station
  Line 4: Buenavista station
 Routes: 10-E, 11-C, 12-B
|Cuauhtémoc
|rowspan=2| Mexico City
|-
|style="background: #FF1100; color: white;"|02
|Fortuna
|Grade level, overground and underground access
|style="text-align:right;"|5.25
|style="text-align:right;"|5.25
|
  Line 6: Ferrería/Arena Ciudad de México station
 Routes: 19, 19-A, 107-B
|Azcapotzalco
|-
|style="background: #FF1100; color: white;"|03
|Tlalnepantla
| rowspan="5" | Grade level, overground access
|style="text-align:right;"|5.12
|style="text-align:right;"|10.37
|
 Tlalnepantla
|rowspan=2| Tlalnepantla
|rowspan=5| State of Mexico
|-
|style="background: #FF1100; color: white;"|04
|San Rafael
|style="text-align:right;"|3.45
|style="text-align:right;"|13.82
|
 San Rafael
|-
|style="background: #FF1100; color: white;"|05
|Lechería
|style="text-align:right;"|4.22
|style="text-align:right;"|18.04
|
 Lechería
  Line II: Lechería station
|rowspan=2| Tultitlán
|-
|style="background: #FF1100; color: white;"|06
|Tultitlán
| rowspan="2" |5 January 2009
|style="text-align:right;"|4.06
|style="text-align:right;"|22.10
|
 Tultitlán
|-
|style="background: #FF1100; color: white;"|07
|Cuautitlán
|style="text-align:right;"|3.91
|style="text-align:right;"|26.01
|
 Cuautitlán
|Cuautitlán
|}

Expansion

Felipe Ángeles International Airport–Lechería
A proposed branch route toward the Felipe Ángeles International Airport (AIFA) in Zumpango is expected to be completed by August 2023. The line takes an already proposed route (Lechería-Xaltocan below) and it will pass the municipalities of Tultitlán, Tultepec, Nextlalpan and Zumpango.

Proposed

In most cases the system would follow existing rail lines; however, grade separations similar to the ones done on the initial segment may be necessary.

In December 2006, SCT announced that approval has been given for the  System 2, extending to Jardines de Morelos and Martín Carrera, and System 3 of an additional  to Chalco and La Paz.

See also 
 Buenavista metro station
 Buenavista railway station (old)
 Commuter rail in North America
 Ferrovalle
 List of suburban and commuter rail systems
 List of Mexican railroads
 Rail transport in Mexico
 Toluca–Mexico City commuter rail

Notes

References

External links 

Ferrocarril Suburbano – Official Site
See definition on Ferropedia
Renderings of railroad cars
Official SCT video and details of the Ferrocarril Suburbano, in Spanish
MEXLIST, the group for Mexican railway information

25 kV AC railway electrification
Electric railways in Mexico
Railway companies of Mexico
Railway lines opened in 2008
Rail transportation in Mexico City
Standard gauge railways in Mexico
Transportation in the State of Mexico